Crown Prince Hyomyeong (18 September 1809 – 25 June 1830), born Yi Yeong, and posthumously honored as King Munjo, was a member of the Joseon Dynasty.

Life and death
The prince was the eldest son of King Sunjo, husband of Queen Sinjeong and father of King Heonjong.

In 1817, the prince was admitted to the Sungkyunkwan. In 1819, he was titled Crown Prince of Joseon. A genius in literature and the arts, he created several court dances (정재) and used court ritual and the arts to validate and augment the King's control over the government.

Hyomyeong first became active in politics when he was only 17, due to his father being ill.
Known to have pursued various political reforms, the prince served as Regent in 1827 until his death 3 years later at age 20.

He did have some enemies amongst his maternal relatives, but avoided nepotism and was a talented writer, composer and choreographer.

Legacy
The prince was  commemorated in an album of six scenes created to celebrate the commencement of his learning at the Songgyungwan, one of a number of documentary paintings (gungjung girokhwa) of the Joseon dynasty.

Among 53 Joseon jeongjaes (정재) or court dances which remain, 26 are his works. His "Chunaengjeon" (Dance of the Spring Nightingale) is the best known and most beloved traditional court dance for its gentle and poetic movements. He was one of the most important people in Korean Court ritual history, along with King Sejong.

His full posthumous name
Crown Prince Hyomyeong has the longest posthumous name for a member of nobility of Korea.
 English: Crown Prince Chewon Chanhwa Seokgeuk Jeongmyeong Seongheon Yeongcheol Yeseong Yeon-gyeong Yungdeok Sun-gong Dokhyu Hong-gyeong Hong-un Seongryeol Seon-gwang Junsang Yoheum Sun-gong U-geun Tangjeong Gyecheon Geontong Sinhun Geondae Gonhu Gwang-up Yeongjo Jang-ui Changryun Haeng-geon Baenyeong Gitae Suyu Huibeom Changhui Ipgyeong Hyeongdo Seongheon Sojang Goeng-yu Sinhwi Suseo Ubok Donmun Hyeonmu In-ui Hyomyeong the Great of Joseon
Hangul: 
Hanja: 體元贊化錫極定命聖憲英哲睿誠淵敬隆德純功篤休弘慶洪運盛烈宣光濬祥堯欽舜恭禹勤湯正啓天建通神勳肅謨乾大坤厚廣業永祚莊義彰倫行健配寧基泰垂裕熙範昌禧立經亨道成獻昭章宏猷愼徽綏緖佑福敦文顯武仁懿孝明大王

Family
 Father: King Sunjo of Joseon (29 July 1790 – 13 December 1834) (조선 순조)
Grandfather : King Jeongjo of Joseon (28 October 1752 – 18 August 1800) (조선 정조)
Grandmother : Royal Noble Consort Su of the Bannam Park clan (8 May 1770 - 26 December 1822) (수빈 박씨)
 Mother: Queen Sunwon of the Andong Kim clan (8 June 1789 - 21 September 1857) (순원왕후 김씨)
Grandfather : Kim Jo-sun (1765 - 1832) (김조순)
Grandmother : Internal Princess Consort Cheongyang of the Cheongsong Shim clan (1766 - 1828) (청양부부인 청송 심씨)
Consorts and their Respective Issue(s):
Queen Sinjeong of the Pungyang Jo clan (21 January 1809 - 4 June 1890) (신정왕후 조씨)
King Heonjong of Joseon (8 September 1827 – 25 July 1849) (조선 헌종)

In popular culture
 Portrayed by Park Bo-gum in the 2016 KBS2 TV series Love in the Moonlight.
 Portrayed by Kim Min-jae in the 2018 film Feng Shui.

See also
 Crown Prince Hyomyeong and Court Dancing
 Hyomyeong, The Crown Prince Who Loved Dancing
 Reenactment of Crown Prince Hyomyeong's Sungkyunkwan Admission Ceremony

References

1809 births
1830 deaths
19th-century Korean monarchs
House of Yi
Korean princes
 Regents of Korea
Heirs apparent who never acceded